Monpezat is a commune in the Pyrénées-Atlantiques department in south-western France.

The Labésiau brook crosses the commune, on its way to the river Gabas.

See also
Communes of the Pyrénées-Atlantiques department
Montpezat
House of Laborde de Monpezat

References

Communes of Pyrénées-Atlantiques
Pyrénées-Atlantiques communes articles needing translation from French Wikipedia